"The Right Life" is a song by Seal, the second single from his fifth studio album System.

Remixes
A remix by Tiësto was released March 11, 2008 as a single on iTunes.

Promo radio remixes

 "The Right Life" (Radio) - 4:05
 "The Right Life" (Tiësto Radio) - 4:59
 "The Right Life" (Mactong Wonderland Radio) - 5:02
 "The Right Life" (Eddie Amador's USA Radio) - 4:30
 "The Right Life" (Trent Cantrelle Radio) - 4:29
 "The Right Life" (Josh Harris Radio) - 3:51

Chart performance

References

2008 singles
Seal (musician) songs
Songs written by Seal (musician)
Song recordings produced by Stuart Price
Songs written by Stuart Price
2008 songs
Warner Music Group singles